Jacek Lech (born Leszek Zerhau; 15 April 1947 in Bielsko-Biała – 25 March 2007 in Katowice) was a popular Polish singer.

Biography
In 1966, he joined the group Czerwono-Czarni. The song Bądź dziewczyną moich marzeń ("Be the girl of my dreams") became an instant hit in Poland. In 1967 he received an award at the National Festival of Polish Song in Opole for the song Pozwólcie śpiewać ptakom ("Let the birds sing"). In 1972, he left Czerwono-Czarni.

In 1973, Lech was injured in a car accident and took a year off to recuperate. In 1974, he released his first solo album, Bądź szczęśliwa.

In 2006, Lech was diagnosed with esophageal cancer. In February 2007, a special concert was organized to help cover the costs of his treatment. Lech also received a Lifetime Achievement Award from the Polish Ministry of Culture.

He died on 25 March 2007.

Discography
1970 – Bądź dziewczyną z moich marzeń
1974 – Bądź szczęśliwa
1977 – Latawce porwał wiatr
1998 – Kolędy

1947 births
2007 deaths
Musicians from Bielsko-Biała
Polish pop singers
Polish rock singers
20th-century Polish male  singers